Mount Kop Tunnel is a road tunnel under construction located on the province border of Bayburt and Erzurum as part of the route   between Maden, Bayburt in the northwest and Aşkale, Erzurum in the southeast in Eastern Anatolia Region, Turkey.

Situated on the Mount Kop of Pontic Mountains, it is a -long twin-tube tunnel. The cost of the construction is estimated to be 319 million.

It was built to bypass the Kop Pass at  elevation with hairpin turns. The tunnel will also eliminate the four-month-long traffic inaccessibility during the winter months due to harsh climatic conditions by heavy snow fall, icing and fog. The tunnel is situated at  elevation.

The groundbreaking ceremony was held in presence of Minister of Transport, Maritime and Communication Binali Yıldırım on 23 August 2012. Excavation works progress about  daily in each tunnel tube. Opening of the tunnel is scheduled end of 2015.Currently, 150 personnel are at work.

References

Road tunnels in Turkey
Transport in Bayburt Province
Transport in Erzurum Province
Transport infrastructure under construction in Turkey